Birger Nerman (6 October 188822 August 1971) was a Swedish archaeologist, historian and philologist who specialized in the history and culture of Iron Age Sweden.

Nerman was educated at Uppsala University, where he began his career as a lecturer in Nordic philology. He participated in archaeological excavations on Stone Age and Iron Age Sweden, and became noted for his efforts to combine archaeological and philological evidence. Areas investigated by Nerman include Gamla Uppsala and Gotland.

From 1923 to 1925, Nerman was professor of archaeology at the University of Dorpat, during which he made contributions to the development of archaeology in Estonia. In subsequent years, he conducted excavations at Grobiņa and other places, with the aim of investigating relations between Sweden and the eastern Baltic in the Iron Age.

Nerman was director of the Swedish History Museum from 1938 to 1954, during which he organized several exhibitions on Swedish history. He was a Swedish nationalist who opposed both Nazism and Communism, and a noted advocate for the independence of the Baltic states. Nerman was the author of several scholarly works on Iron Age archaeology, and popular works on the culture and history of early Sweden.

Early life and education
Birger Nerman was born in Norrköping, Sweden, on 6 October 1888. He was the son of Janne Nerman, a bookseller, and Ida Nordberg.

Nerman became a student in philology at Uppsala University in 1907, where he gained his doctorate in 1913 with a dissertation entitled Svärges hedna litteratur (Sweden's Pagan Literature), which was concerned with the Ynglingatal. Among his professors at Uppsala were Knut Stjerna, who left a strong influence on him. In studying Old English and Old Norse literature, Nerman argued that works such as Beowulf contained traces from Swedish oral literature of the Migration Period. His dissertation was criticized by several philologists for its use of archaeological evidence. This criticism encouraged Nerman to focus more on archaeology rather than philology, although he throughout his remaining career would continue to advocate cooperation between the two disciplines.

Early career

Together with Stjerna and later Oscar Almgren, Nerman became increasingly involved in archaeological research on the Swedish Stone Age and Iron Age. By combining philological and archaeological evidence, Nerman sought to gain further insight into the history and culture of Iron Age Sweden. His work in this regard was positively received by many Swedish archaeologists, including Oscar Montelius, and philologists. He participated in excavations at Gamla Uppsala, Vendel and Adelsö. His excavations at Gamla Uppsala were carried out with Sune Lindqvist.

From 1914, Nerman became increasingly involved with archaeological excavations in Gotland and the Baltic states. The connection between these two areas during the Iron Age became a subject of great interest to him. His publications on the archaeology of Iron Age Gotland, many of which were co-written with Almgren, became standard works on the subject.

At Uppsala University, Nerman was appointed an assistant professor in 1917, and a docent in 1919. During this time he lectured on Nordic philology, with particular focus on the sagas.

Research in the eastern Baltic
From 1923 to 1925, Nerman was Professor of Archaeology at the University of Dorpat, during which he laid the foundations for modern archaeology in Estonia. His years at Dorpat would prove instrumental for his future scholarship. He conducted archaeological research at Izborsk, Estonia, in 1924.

Combined with his duties at the university, Nerman wrote a number of works on Swedish history intended for a popular audience. In En utvandring från Gotland och öns införlivande med Sveaväldet (1923) and Det svenska rikets uppkomst (1925), he argued that the Swedes had a powerful state and engaged in extensive colonizing ventures in the eastern Baltic as early as the Vendel Period. Nerman was a Swedish nationalist, and several of his works should be understood not only as scholarly contributions, but also as manifestations of Nerman's patriotism.

In 1929–1930, Nerman led excavations at Grobiņa, Latvia. The results of the excavations were published in Die Verbindungen zwischen Skandinavien und dem Ostbaltikum in der jüngeren Eisenzeit (1929). He believed that Grobiņa had been founded as a Swedish/Gotlandic colony, and that it was identical to the town of Seeburg mentioned by Rimbert in Vita Ansgarii. Scandinavian burials examined by Nerman at Grobiņa have been dated to as early as 650 AD, and thus predate the Viking Age.  The finds at Grobiņa encouraged Nerman to conduct further research at Apuolė and Wiskiauten in 1931.

Director of the Swedish History Museum
After his return from Dorpat, Nerman worked for the Swedish History Museum, serving as its director from 1938 to 1954. He supervised the renovation of the museum building, and organized a number of successful exhibitions. Nerman spent much efforts at making the collections at the museum as accessible to the public as possible. He combined his duties at the museum with engagements as an author and public speaker.

From his days as a university professor in Estonia, he held a fondness for the Baltic states and its peoples. Nerman was an advocate for the independence of the Baltic states and rights of Balts and Estonians. During World War II, he was a member of anti-Nazi and anti-communist organizations.

Nerman retired from the Swedish History Museum in 1954. After his retirement, he continued to author works on Swedish archaeology.

Personal life
Nerman married Zelma Nerman on 21 January 1932. He died in Stockholm on 22 August 1971. Nerman was survived by two daughters and several grandchildren.

Selected works
 
 
 
 
 (With Oscar Almgren)

See also
 Hector Munro Chadwick
 Jan de Vries (philologist)
 Herbert Jankuhn
 Anders Kaliff
 Gustaf Kossinna
 Magnus Olsen
 Eric Oxenstierna
 Gudmund Schütte

References

1888 births
1971 deaths
Directors of museums in Sweden
Germanic studies scholars
Old Norse studies scholars
People from Norrköping
Swedish archaeologists
Swedish philologists
Swedish anti-communists
Swedish anti-fascists
Academic staff of the University of Tartu
Uppsala University alumni
Academic staff of Uppsala University
Writers on Germanic paganism
20th-century archaeologists
20th-century philologists